Jazz Showcase is one of the oldest jazz clubs in Chicago, Illinois, founded in 1947 by NEA Jazz Master Joe Segal, whose son Wayne now owns and operates the venue. Segal's various showcases have served as a launch pad for a number of career jazz musicians.

Locations
Having changed location numerous times since its founding, the club last relocated in 2008 to a South Plymouth Court address on the side of the rebuilt Dearborn Station, in Chicago, Illinois. To honor Segal, South Plymouth Court was renamed Joe Segal Way by the City of Chicago at the behest of Alderman Bob Fioretti. One of its previous locations was in The Blackstone Hotel for 14 years from 1981 to 1995.

Club owner
Joe Segal (April 24, 1926 – August 10, 2020) founded the Jazz Showcase in 1947 in Chicago, Illinois and was the club's owner until his death in 2020. Born April 24, 1926 in Philadelphia, he grew up listening to Louis Armstrong, Sidney Bechet and Fats Waller on the radio. When he was old enough, he would visit the Earl Theater to watch them perform.

The Air Force drafted Segal in 1944 and he was stationed in Champaign, Illinois for a while. When he had leave, he rode the train to Chicago to attend live jazz performances at clubs on Randolph Street. Following his military discharge, Segal moved to Chicago, enrolled in Roosevelt College on the G.I. Bill and worked at different jazz venues around the city. In 1947, he worked with his classmates, Gus Savage, who was chairman of the Social Activities Committee for Roosevelt, and Bennett Johnson to organize a weekly jam session. They presented jazz greats such Charlie Parker, Lester Young, Sonny Rollins and many others. For the next ten years he organized live jazz sessions on the school's campus featuring musicians he met working at various local jazz venues.

Beginning in 1957,  Segal ran his showcase shows in what he later estimated was 63 different locations over the years. By the 1970s, Segal opened a formal club called the Jazz Showcase on Rush Street. He gave performers a five evening run with a Sunday show to encourage young people to attend.

In 2013, Segal received an honorary doctorate from his alma mater, Roosevelt University. In 2014, Segal was given the rare honor of being a club owner/presenter chosen by the National Endowment for the Arts as an NEA Jazz Master.
 
 Muhal Richard Abrams
 Eric Alexander
 Monty Alexander
 Mose Allison
 Ernestine Anderson
 The Art Ensemble of Chicago
 Kenny Barron
 Gary Bartz
 Count Basie
 George Benson
 Walter Bishop Jr.
 Art Blakey and the Jazz Messengers
 Joanne Brackeen
 Bobby Broom
 Kenny Burrell
 The Capp-Pierce Juggernaut
 James Carter
 Richie Cole
 George Coleman
 Ornette Coleman
 Ravi Coltrane
 Larry Coryell
 Hank Crawford
 Eddie "Lockjaw" Davis
 Joey DeFrancesco
 Lou Donaldson
 Kenny Drew Jr.
 Bill Evans
 Art Farmer
 Joe Farrell
 Tommy Flanagan
 Sonny Fortune
 Von Freeman
 Dizzy Gillespie
 Benny Golson
 Dexter Gordon
 Bunky Green
 Johnny Griffin
 Roy Hargrove
 Winard Harper
 Tom Harrell
 Barry Harris
 Eddie Harris
 Freddie Hubbard
 Bobby Hutcherson
 Milt Jackson
 Ahmad Jamal
 Eddie Jefferson
 Philly Joe Jones
 The Thad Jones/Mel Lewis Orchestra
 Barney Kessel
 Rahsaan Roland Kirk
 Yusef Lateef
 Bobby Lewis
 Joe Lovano
 Harold Mabern
 Pat Mallinger
 Marbin
 Pat Martino
 Jack McDuff
 Howard McGhee
 Jimmy McGriff
 Marian McPartland
 Charles McPherson
 Frank Morgan
 Joe Pass
 Danilo Perez
 Willie Pickens
 Chris Potter
 Sonny Rollins
 Zoot Sims/Al Cohn
 Jimmy Smith
 Lonnie Liston Smith
 Sonny Stitt
 Ira Sullivan
 Sun Ra
 Stanley Turrentine
 McCoy Tyner
 Cedar Walton
 Michael Weiss
 Paul Wertico
 Randy Weston
 Joe Williams

Live recordings
 Gene Ammons and Dexter Gordon, The Chase! (1970)
 Louie Bellson, Live at Joe Segal's Jazz Showcase (Concord Jazz, 1987)
 Ahmad Jamal, Chicago Revisited: Live at Joe Segal's Jazz Showcase (Telarc, 1992)
 Bob Lark/Phil Woods, Live at the Jazz Showcase (Jazzed Media, 2006)
 Marian McPartland and Willie Pickens, Ain't Misbehavin': Live at the Jazz Showcase (Concord Jazz, 2000)
 Danilo Pérez, Live at the Jazz Showcase (Artistshare, 2003)
 Ira Sullivan and Stu Katz, A Family Affair: Live at Joe Segal's Jazz Showcase (Origin, 2010)
 Phil Wilson and the Big Band Machine, Live at Joe Segal's Jazz Showcase (1984)

See also
List of jazz clubs

References

External links
 

Music venues completed in 1947
Jazz clubs in Chicago
1947 establishments in Illinois